Theodoric of York, Medieval Barber was a comedic sketch on the American television show Saturday Night Live which first aired on April 22, 1978. The title character was  a barber surgeon played by comedian Steve Martin, a frequent host of the show. The central gag revolved around Theodoric's belief in bloodletting as a solution to his patients' maladies. The character was brought back in a sequel, "Theodoric of York, Medieval Judge" on November 4 of the same year, in which Theodoric applied the same unenlightened methods to jurisprudence.

As an example of his method of procedure, in the initial sketch, Theodoric explained to the mother of a sick girl:

At the climax of both sketches, Theodoric would propose profound, innovative ideas that had the potential to change the course of history, but would ultimately dismiss them, as in:

The second of the sketches, "Theodoric of York, Medieval Judge," lampooned both the medieval and modern judicial systems. In this skit, Martin's character would summarily pass judgment based on the outcomes of trials by ordeal, such as throwing a woman accused of witchcraft weighted into a river to see if she would drown: if the accused floated, she was determined to be guilty (because only by using her occult powers could she have risen to the surface), and if she sank and drowned, she was innocent. Upon deciding the accused was guilty, Theodoric would refer to the Writ of Common Wisdom (a huge, dusty tome) to decide appropriate punishment. In the case of a man found guilty of adultery (having previously been tried of stealing and lying), Theodoric finds the punishment in the Writ so embarrassing, he can't read it publicly, and instead whispers it in the defendant's ear.  

As with "Theodoric of York, Medieval Barber," the "Medieval Judge" skit ended with Martin's proposing modern legal concepts such as trial by a jury of one's peers, provision of defense counsel, innocence until proven guilty, prohibition of cruel and unusual punishments, etc., but end by saying... "Naaaaaaaahhh!"

On October 14, 1978, SCTV aired a skit called "Master Ralph Roister Doister" (named after (but not in any way based on) the actual 16th century play by Nicholas Udall) similarly satirizing the supposed ignorance and uncleanliness of medieval times. This focused on a poverty-stricken medieval couple (played by Dave Thomas and Catherine O'Hara with burlesque English accents) attempting to survive famine, plague, high taxes, and the harassment of the local sheriff (Joe Flaherty).

See also
 Recurring Saturday Night Live characters and sketches

Fictional hairdressers
Male characters in television
Saturday Night Live characters
Saturday Night Live sketches
Saturday Night Live in the 1970s
Fictional judges
Fictional English people
Fictional medieval European people